Myna Nandhini (born 21 May 1991) is an Indian actress and television personality who is best known as Myna Revathi in Saravanan Meenatchi (season 2), Alabarai Myna in Chinna Thambi and for her major breakthrough role Mynavathi in Aranmanai 3 (2021). She is also the winner of the cooking show Kitchen Super Star (season 3) which aired on Star Vijay in 2015. In 2022, she participated in Bigg Boss 6 as a contestant and became the 3rd runner-up.

She is best known for her roles in films such as Vamsam (2010), Kedi Billa Killadi Ranga (2013), Romeo Juliet (2015), Kanchana 3 (2019), Namma Veettu Pillai (2019), Petromax (2019), Aranmanai 3 (2021) and Vikram (2022).

Early life
Born as Nandhini Rajendran to her parents Rajendran and Rani on 21 May 1991 in a remote town in Madurai, Tamil Nadu. Nandhini went on to study at Meenakshi Matriculation School, Madurai and Ambiga College of Arts and Science, Anna Nagar where she completed her Bachelor of Business Administration (BBA) degree. However after completing her degree she decided to act in few television drama's as a "Time killer".

Career
Nandhini debuted her career as an actress in the film Vennila Kabadi Kuzhu as a un credited role in the film. She later made her television debut with the comedy reality show Kalakka Povathu Yaaru where she participated as a contestant. In 2010, she was approached by director Pandiraj who offered her a role in his film Vamsam she later agreed to the offer and played the supporting role of Sarasu. She later also appeared in films such as Kedi Billa Killadi Ranga (2013), Vellaikaara Durai (2014) and Romeo Juliet. In 2016, she made her debut as an actress in television by appearing in the soap opera Saravanan Meenatchi (season 3) playing the role of a friend to female protoganist, her role in the drama was highly credited and praised. Her name in that role "Myna" got popular afterwards. She also appeared in television shows such as Amudha Oru Aacharyakuri, Pandian Stores, Aranmanai Kili and Chinna Thambi. In 2022, actor Kamal Haasan approached Nandhini offering her a crucial role in his action film Vikram she later accepted the offer and starred opposing actor Vijay Sethupathi in the film. Later that year she also appeared in the film Sardar appearing as a cameo role as a drama artist in the film.

She also played a crucial role in the 2021 web series November Story alongside actors Tamannaah, G. M. Kumar and Pasupathy. The web series also marked Nandhini's debut web series.

Personal life
In 2017, Nandhini married her long time boyfriend Karthikeyan (Karthick) in January. However 6 months into their marriage Karthick committed suicide after a misunderstanding among the couple. In 2019 she re married this time to television actor and comedian Yogeswaram, in 2020 the couple was blessed with a child. She is also the cousin of Sri lankan singer and songwriter  Dinesh Kanagaratnam.

Filmography

Films

Television Shows

Television Serials

Web series

References

External links

 

Living people
1991 births
Indian television actresses
Indian film actresses
21st-century Indian actresses
Actresses in Tamil cinema
Actresses in Tamil television
Tamil television actresses
Bigg Boss (Tamil TV series) contestants